John Alexander "Jack" MacDuff (born February 16, 1950) is an air traffic controller and curler. He skipped Newfoundland to its first ever Brier championship in 1976.

Curling
Born in Halifax, Nova Scotia, the son of Jim and Eileen MacDuff, MacDuff was the skip of the 1976 men's curling team representing the province of Newfoundland and Labrador that won the 1976 Canadian Men's curling championship. It was the first time the province had won the Canadian Men's curling championship. Members of the team were, Jack MacDuff, Toby McDonald, Doug Hudson and Ken Templeton. The team represented Canada at the 1976 Air Canada Silver Broom World Championship, finishing in 9th place with a 2–7 record. As of 2022, it is Canada's worst ever finish at the World Men's Curling Championship.

MacDuff currently lives in Moncton, New Brunswick. He is unable to curl due to having multiple sclerosis.

References

External links
 
 
 Jack MacDuff – Curling Canada Stats Archive

Curlers from New Brunswick
Curlers from Newfoundland and Labrador
Curlers from Nova Scotia
1950 births
Living people
Brier champions
People with multiple sclerosis
Air traffic controllers
Canadian male curlers
Sportspeople from St. John's, Newfoundland and Labrador
Sportspeople from Halifax, Nova Scotia
Sportspeople from Moncton